Henriques is a common surname in the Portuguese language, namely in Portugal and Brazil. It was originally a patronymic, meaning Son of Henrique. Its Spanish equivalent is Enriquez and its Italian equivalent is D'Enrico.

List of persons with the surname
Afonso Henriques (1106/11–1185), first king of Portugal
Afonso Henriques de Lima Barreto (1881–1922), Brazilian novelist and journalist
Andréa Henriques (born 1980), Brazilian water polo player
Androula Henriques (born 1936), social activist from Cyprus
Anna Henriques-Nielsen (1881–1962), Danish actress
Artur Alberto de Campos Henriques (1853–1922), former prime minister of Portugal
Basil Henriques (1890–1961), Jewish philanthropist
Bob Henriques (born 1930), American photojournalist
Edouard F. Henriques, make-up artist
Esther Gehlin-Henriques (1892–1949), Danish-Swedish painter
Fini Henriques (1867–1940), Danish composer
Francisco Henriques (14??–1518), Flemish Renaissance painter
Gregg Henriques, American psychologist
Henrique Henriques (1520–1600), Portuguese Jesuit priest, missionary in South India
Inês Henriques (born 1980), Portuguese first women's world 50 km race walk champion
Jacob Henriques de Castro Sarmento (1692–1762), Portuguese estrangeirado, physician and naturalist
 (1823–1858), Portuguese precursor of socialism and republicanism in Portugal
Julian Henriques (born 1951), British filmmaker, writer and academic
Julio Augusto Henriques (1838–1928), Portuguese botanist
 (1923–2009), Portuguese sculptor
Marie Henriques (1866–1944), Danish-Jewish painter
Martin Henriques (1825–1912), Danish-Jewish businessman
Moisés Henriques (born 1987), Portugal-born Australian cricketer
Moses Cohen Henriques (17th century), Caribbean Jewish pirate
 (1820–1848), Danish painter
Pauline Henriques (1914–1998), Jamaican-born English actress
 (17th century), English Jewish merchant
 (born 1930), French sculptor
Robert Henriques (1905–1967), British writer, broadcaster and farmer
 (1858–1914), Danish Jewish composer
Ruben Henriques Jr. (1771–1846), Danish Jewish banker
 (1857–1902), German chemist
Rose Henriques (1889–1972), British artist 
Sally Henriques (1815–1886), Jewish Danish painter
 (1821–1893), Jewish Danish painter
Sean Paul Henriques (born 1973), Jamaican reggae artist known as Sean Paul
Vicente Henriques (born 1978), Brazilian water polo player
Diana B. Henriques (born 1948), American financial journalist and author

See also
Henriques family

Patronymic surnames
Portuguese-language surnames
Sephardic surnames
Surnames from given names